Quaker Gap is an unincorporated community in Stokes County, North Carolina, United States, approximately five miles southwest of county seat Danbury, near Hanging Rock State Park.

References

Unincorporated communities in Stokes County, North Carolina
Unincorporated communities in North Carolina